Bone Box is an acoustic 15-track collection of Saints and solo material recorded in Amsterdam by Chris Bailey and The General Dog.

Track listing 
	"(I’m) Stranded"*
	"No Time"*
	"Let's Pretend"
	"In the Mirror"
	"All Fools Day"
	"Marie Antoinette"
	"Love or Imagination"
	"Grain of Sand"
	"This Perfect Day"*
	"MissUnderstood"*
	"Nights in Venice"*
	"Know Your Product"*
	"Ghost Ships"
	"Casablanca"
	"Just Like Fire Would"

All Tracks:copyright Lost Music/Mushroom Music Publishing except* published by 
Saints Music/Mushroom Music Publishing

Personnel 
Chris Bailey – voice, guitar, composer, producer
Caspar Wijnberg – voice, bass, organ, didgeridoo, rainsticks, sound engineer/ producer
Peter Wilkinson – voice, drum, percussion
Adam-Bar-Pereng – piano, organ
Sahand Sahebdivani – tar

2005 albums
Chris Bailey (musician) albums